The Maldives Reform Movement is a political party in the Maldives officially founded on 20 November 2019. The Elections Commission authorized the formation on 2 October 2019. The party was conceived by founder of MRM  Yumna Maumoon's father and former president Maumoon Abdul Gayoom after disagreements with Abdulla Yameen about the direction of the Progressive Party of Maldives.

History
MRM is the third political party established by Maumoon Abdul Gayoom, who as of the party's founding was Asia's longest-serving president by time in office. He established the Dhivehi Rayyithunge Party (DRP) in 2005 after giving his consent legalizing political parties in Maldives. His disputes with the party leader at the time, Ahmed Thasmeen Ali, led to him leaving and establishing the Progressive Party of Maldives (PPM) in October 2011. Nonetheless, Maumoon left the PPM in 2017 over a dispute over its leadership with his estranged half-brother, former president Abdulla Yameen.

The function to form the party was held on 7 November 2019 where the former president, Maumoon was appointed as the President of the party. Maldives Reform Movement (MRM) has received the official certificate of registration with the Elections Commission on 20 November 2019.

On 2 October 2021 MRM held its congress and former MP Ahmed Faris Maumoon was elected as its president while Aiminath Nadira and Shazail Shiyam was elected as the deputies.

The main councils of the Party is Youth Council and Women's Council, Ibrahim Farhaad was elected as the president of the youth council and Al.Usthaazaa Aminath Rifga was elected as the Vice President of the Youth Council. Aarizaa Rasheed was elected as the President of the women's council and Hawwa Iffath as the Vice President of the Women's council

References

Islamic political parties in the Maldives
Political parties established in 2019
2019 establishments in the Maldives